Information: The New Language of Science is a 2003 book by Hans Christian von Baeyer, Chancellor Professor of Physics at the College of William and Mary, examining contemporary information science.

References

Information science
2003 non-fiction books